William Henry Linward (1877–1940) was an English footballer who played as an outside left for Doncaster Rovers, West Ham United, Woolwich Arsenal, Norwich City, Kilmarnock and Maidstone United at the turn of the 19th century.

Club career
Born in Hull, Linward is first known as playing for Grimsby All Saints, from where he moved to Doncaster Rovers in the Midland League for the start of the 1895–86 season.

Doncaster Rovers
He scored his first goal on his home debut in a 3–0 victory over Mansfield Town in front of a 1000 crowd. His time at Doncaster involved two Midland League championships and one runner up, plus being runner up in the Yorkshire League. In all competitive games in his 6 seasons at Doncaster he scored 65 goals including two hattricks. On 5 November 1898, he scored twice against Huddersfield in the Yorkshire League in the still standing joint record 14−0 Doncaster win.

West Ham United
Just as Doncaster were elected into the Football League for the 1901–02 season, Linward moved to Southern League club West Ham United receiving a wage of £2.10s a week. He played in all 30 League games for West Ham that season plus one FA Cup game before being bought by Second Division club, Woolwich Arsenal in the December of the 1902–03 season.

Woolwich Arsenal
His debut for the second 11 was against Millwall Athletic on Boxing Day and then his full first team debut was following day against Burnley. His first goal was the third in a 3–1 win over Preston North End on 3 January 1903. During his second season, Linward played an important part in Arsenal's promotion to the First Division for the first time in their history. This included scoring 5 times in 27 League games. After playing only 6 League games the following season in the top division, Linward moved in the summer to Norwich City.

Norwich City
He joined the Citizens (as the team were then nicknamed) when they first became a Southern League club, making his debut on 2 September 1905 in a 2–0 defeat at Plymouth Argyle, thus having the honour of appearing in their first ever match as a professional side. He played again against Watford and Brighton before the month was out but this would be the sum of his Norwich City contribution and after failing to secure a first team place, he left at the end of the season.

He spent the next season at Kilmarnock, the following one in non league football in Kent, with Maidstone United and later Dartford.

Linward died in West Ham in 1940 aged 62 years.

Honours
Doncaster Rovers
 Midland League 
 Champions: 1896–97, 1898–99
 Runners up: 1900–01
 Yorkshire League
 Runners up: 1898–99
 Mexborough Montague Charity Cup
 Winners: 1900–01

Arsenal
 Football League Second Division
 Runners up: 1903–04

References

1877 births
1940 deaths
Footballers from Kingston upon Hull
English footballers
Association football forwards
Doncaster Rovers F.C. players
Arsenal F.C. players
West Ham United F.C. players
Norwich City F.C. players
Kilmarnock F.C. players
Maidstone United F.C. (1897) players
Dartford F.C. players
English Football League players
Scottish Football League players
Midland Football League players